William Kip may refer to:
 William Ingraham Kip, American Episcopal bishop
 William Fargo Kip, American lawyer and legal librarian